Michael Gordon may refer to:

Entertainment
 Michael Gordon (film director) (1909–1993), American film director
 Michael Gordon (film editor) (1909–2008), British film editor
 Michael Z. Gordon (born 1941), American film and TV producer and composer
 Michael Gordon (actor) (born 1948), German-American actor in The Space Museum
 Michael Gordon (composer) (born 1956), American classical composer
 Michael Zev Gordon (born 1963), British composer
 Mike Gordon (born 1965), American rock musician
 Mick Gordon (director) (born 1970), Northern Irish theater director, playwright, and essayist
 Mick Gordon (composer) (born 1985), Australian composer and sound designer
 Michael Gordon (writer), writer on Late Night with Conan O'Brien television show, see Writers Guild of America Awards 2007

Sports
 Mike Gordon (baseball) (1953–2014), American baseball player
 Michael Gordon (rugby league) (born 1983), Australian professional rugby league footballer
 Michael Gordon (footballer) (born 1984), English footballer

Other
 Michael J. C. Gordon (1948–2017), British computer scientist
 Mike Gordon (politician) (1957–2005), California State Assemblyman
 Michael Gordon (Australian journalist) (1955–2018), Australian newspaper journalist
 Michael R. Gordon, military correspondent for The Wall Street Journal
 Michael Gordon (businessman), co-founder of Vink Asset Management, president of Fenway Sports Group

See also

 Gordon (surname)